The Cocoa Processing Company Limited is a Ghanaian cocoa processing company. They are listed on the stock index of the Ghana Stock Exchange, the GSE All-Share Index. It formed in 1981.

Products
Chocolate Varieties (Tetteh Quarshie Bar (TQ Bar), Kingsbite, Oranco bar, Akuafo Bar, Portem Pride, Portem Nut, Coffeechoc)
Choco-Bake	
Choco Delight (chocolate spread)
Groundnut Coated with Chocolate (Pebbles (Chocolate dragees))
Royal Natural Cocoa Powder
Alltime (Instant drinking chocolate)
Vitaco (Instant drinking chocolate)

The Company’s products have won several local and international quality awards, thereby confirming the organoleptic quality of food products presented to consumers. In the year 2002, nine of the company’s products have been presented at the World Quality Selections, organized by Monde Selection. Eight of them (the seven branded chocolates and Alltime) have received a Gold Quality Award and one of them (Vitaco) – a Silver Quality Award.

See also
 List of bean-to-bar chocolate manufacturers

References

External links
Cocoa Processing Company official homepage
Cocoa Processing Company at Alacrastore
Cocoa industry, at Ghana Embassy Japan

Food and drink companies of Ghana
Food and drink companies established in 1981
Companies listed on the Ghana Stock Exchange
Ghanaian chocolate companies